CrossFit is a branded fitness regimen that involves constantly varied functional movements performed at high intensity. The method was developed by Greg Glassman, who founded CrossFit with Lauren Jenai in 2000, with CrossFit its registered trademark.  The company forms what has been described as the biggest fitness chain in the world, with around 12,000 affiliated gyms in over 150 countries as of 2022, under half of which are located in the United States.

CrossFit is promoted as both a physical exercise philosophy and a competitive fitness sport, incorporating elements from high-intensity interval training, Olympic weightlifting, plyometrics, powerlifting, gymnastics, kettlebell lifting, calisthenics, strongman, and other exercises. It is practised by members in CrossFit-affiliated gyms, and by individuals who complete daily workouts (otherwise known as "WODs" or "Workouts of the Day").

CrossFit has been criticized for causing more injuries than other sporting activities such as traditional weightlifting; however, an article in the Journal of Sports Rehabilitation found that "the risk of injury from participation in CrossFit is comparable to or lower than some common forms of exercise or strength training".  There are also concerns that its methodology may cause exertional rhabdomyolysis, a possible life-threatening breakdown of muscle from extreme exertion.

History

CrossFit, meaning cross-discipline fitness, was conceived as a company in 1996 as Cross-Fit. Greg Glassman and Lauren Jenai incorporated CrossFit, Inc. in 2000. They opened a gym in Santa Cruz, California in 2001 and posted their workouts on the Internet for their clients, and these workouts were then quickly adopted by individuals in the police, military, firefighting services. The first affiliated gym (known as 'box') to form was CrossFit North in Seattle, Washington when Glassman's internet postings were used by those who wanted to officially incorporate his workouts into their training regimen in 2002. Glassman then began to develop a curriculum to train and certify coaches and gym owners using his methodology. Coaches associated with CrossFit include Louie Simmons, John Welbourn, and Bob Harper.

The number of CrossFit-affiliated gyms grew quickly: there were 13 gyms in 2005, 8,000 in 2013, and more than 13,000 in 2016. By 2018, there were over 15,000 CrossFit gyms in 162 countries. Its membership worldwide has been estimated to between two and five million. However, the COVID-19 pandemic forced the closure of around 20% of its gyms (around 25% in the US), and disaffiliations due to the Glassman controversy in 2020 further reduced the number of paid affiliations to 9,400 by early 2021. The number has since recovered to around 12,500 including non-paying affiliates (10,800 paying) by early 2022. Strong growth was observed in Europe, with France having the most CrossFit gyms outside of United States. 

Glassman obtained complete control over the company in 2012 after a divorce with Jenai, who tried to sell her share in the company to an outside party after the divorce settlement, but Glassman bought it with a $16 million loan from Summit Partners.

On June 24, 2020, following the outcry after Glassman's comments regarding the murder of George Floyd it was announced that he was selling the company to Eric Roza, former CEO of Datalogix, in partnership with an investment firm Berkshire Partners. Roza assumed the role of CEO after the conclusion of the sale in July. In late November, CrossFit announced a building lease for its Boulder headquarters. At the end of 2020, CrossFit became an LLC.

Overview

CrossFit is a strength, conditioning, and overall fitness program consisting mainly of a mix of aerobic exercise, calisthenics (bodyweight exercises), and Olympic weightlifting. CrossFit, LLC describes its strength and conditioning program as "constantly varied functional movements executed at high intensity across broad time and modal domains." CrossFit aims to develop fitness in what the company deems to be the ten components of physical fitness: cardiovascular/respiratory endurance, stamina, strength, flexibility, power, speed, coordination, agility, balance, accuracy. Usually, the duration and content of each workout is not fixed.

Hour-long classes at affiliated gyms, or "boxes," typically include a warm-up, a skill development segment, the high-intensity "Workout of the Day" (or WOD), and a period of individual or group stretching. Some gyms also often have a strength-focused movement prior to the WOD, though CrossFit encourages most athletes to prioritize intensity over supplemental strength training or additional programming. Performance on each WOD is often scored and/or ranked to encourage competition and to track individual progress. Some affiliates offer additional classes, such as Olympic weightlifting, which are not centered on a WOD.

CrossFit gyms use equipment from multiple disciplines, including barbells, dumbbells, gymnastics rings, rope climbs, pull-up bars, jump ropes, kettlebells, medicine balls, plyo boxes, resistance bands, rowing machines, and various mats. CrossFit is focused on "constantly varied high-intensity functional movement," drawing on categories and exercises such as calisthenics, Olympic-style weightlifting, powerlifting, strongman-type events, plyometrics, bodyweight exercises, indoor rowing, aerobic exercise, running, and swimming.

CrossFit programming is decentralized, but its general methodology is used by thousands of private affiliated gyms, fire departments, law-enforcement agencies, and military organizations, including the Royal Danish Life Guards, as well as by some U.S. and Canadian high school physical education teachers, high school and college sports teams, and the Miami Marlins.

A 2014 statistical analysis showed that 50% of CrossFit participants were male and 50% were female. CrossFit's growing interest internationally has created a spike in Olympic weightlifting interest in the United States.

Business model

CrossFit, LLC licenses the CrossFit name to gyms for an annual fee and certifies trainers. Besides the standard two-day "Level 1 Certificate Course," CrossFit offers a Level 2 Certificate Course, CrossFit Kids Course, and many online course offerings. Level 3 Trainer examination and Level 4 Coach assessment are also available.   During the COVID-19 pandemic, CrossFit also began offering an Online Level 1 Course. CrossFit preferred courses include gymnastics, Olympic weightlifting, powerlifting, strongman, running and endurance, rowing, kettlebells, mobility and recovery, and self-defense and striking.

Other specialized adaptations include programs for pregnant women, seniors, and military special operations candidates. Affiliates develop their own programming, pricing, and instructional methods. Many athletes and trainers see themselves as part of a contrarian, insurgent movement that questions conventional fitness wisdom. In addition to performing prescribed workouts, they follow CrossFit's nutrition recommendations, adopting a paleo, keto and/or zone diets, or counting macros.

CrossFit makes use of a virtual community internet model. The company says this de-centralized approach shares some common features with open source software projects and allows best practices to emerge from a variety of approaches, a contention that is disputed by some competitors and former affiliates.

In 2018, there were over 15,000 CrossFit affiliates in 162 countries.

CrossFit Games

The CrossFit Games, created and directed by Dave Castro until 2021, have been held every summer since 2007. Athletes at the Games compete in workouts they learn about only hours beforehand, sometimes including surprise elements that are not part of the typical CrossFit regimen. Past examples include a rough-water swim, a softball throw, and a pegboard climb. The Games are styled as a venue for determining the "Fittest on Earth," where competitors should be "ready for anything."

In 2011, the Games adopted an online qualification format, facilitating participation by athletes worldwide. During the five-week-long "CrossFit Open", one new workout is released each week.  Athletes have several days to complete the workout and submit their scores online, with either a video or validation by a CrossFit affiliate. Since the Open is available to any level of athlete, many affiliates encourage member participations. The Open has been described as the largest participatory sporting event in the world,  and the number of worldwide participants reached 415,000 in 2018. 

From 2011 to 2018, the top CrossFit Open performers for individuals and teams in each region advance to the regional events, held over the following two months around the world. Each regional event qualifies a specified number of its top finishers to send to the Games. The Games include divisions for individuals of each gender, co-ed teams, and a number of Masters and Teenage age groups.

For the 2019 Games, regionals were discontinued and individual athletes qualify by either being the national champion in the Open, finishing in the top 20 worldwide in the Open, winning a CrossFit-sanctioned event, or by invitation. In 2020, due to COVID-19 pandemic the Games format was significantly altered for 2020 CrossFit Games: the competition was separated into two parts, with the first part consisting of an online contest for 60 athletes, with the top five male and female finishers qualified for the second part and they participated in-person in the final in Aromas, California.  The Games format returned to normal in 2021, but the qualification system was revamped; the participants  qualified based on their continental regions, and a Quarterfinal stage was added between the Open and the Semifinals.

Certifications 
There are four levels of CrossFit coach certification. To open a CrossFit affiliated gym, it only requires a coach to be certified to level one.

Level One (CF-L1) is the introduction level, where participants attend a group weekend class, talk about the basic methodology and fundamentals of CrossFit, and learn how to conduct their classes. They go over techniques and how to adjust them for those who cannot perform them. After completing the Level One training course, one should be confident in conducting a class, scale workouts accordingly for athletes, and hold CrossFit to its standards.

In the second level, training goes deeper into the mechanics of the movements and how to be leaders and communicate with other students. In the Level Two course, participants learn about athletic capacity and are evaluated as a trainer in groups.

To earn the Level Three certificate, a coach one must complete 1,500 hours of active fitness coaching and become CPR certified. To maintain the certification, Level 3 coaches must obtain 50 continuing education units every three years. To earn the Level Four certificate, the highest level currently recognized by CrossFit, Inc., the coach must record several years as a Level Three and pass a test.

Criticism

Injury
The risk of injury associated with CrossFit training has been a controversial question since the program's popularity began to climb in the early 2000s. Critics have accused CrossFit, Inc. of using dangerous movements and inappropriate levels of intensity, and allowing underqualified individuals to become CrossFit Trainers.

In response to these criticisms, CrossFit, Inc. claims, "CrossFit is relatively safe even when performed with poor technique, but it is safer and more effective when performed with good technique." CrossFit, Inc. also claims the risk of injury can be reduced by properly scaling and modifying workouts, a concept taught on its website and at the CrossFit Level 1 Trainer Course.

CrossFit supports this position by citing three academic surveys of CrossFit participants. These surveys calculated injury rates between 2.4 and 3.1 injuries per 1000 hours of training, which CrossFit argues is consistent with or below injury rates found in "general fitness training." A 2018 review of scientific literature also found that "injury rate with CrossFit was comparable to or lower than injury rates with Olympic weightlifting, distance running, military conditioning, track and field, rugby, or gymnastics." More men than women suffered from injuries, with shoulder injuries found to be more common (25%) than lower back (14.3%) and knee (13.1%), and injuries can occur where supervision was not always available to athletes.

Lawsuit by CrossFit, Inc. against the NSCA
A 2013 study published in the Journal of Strength and Conditioning Research entitled "Crossfit-based high-intensity power training improves maximal aerobic fitness and body composition" followed 54 participants for ten weeks of CrossFit training. The study said that "...a notable percentage of our subjects (16%) did not complete the training program and return for follow-up testing." "The authors said "This may call into question the risk-benefit ratio for such extreme training programs..." Out of the "10 of the 11 participants who did not complete the study have provided their reasons for not finishing, with only 2 mentioning injury or health conditions that prevented them from completing follow-up testing."

In 2014, CrossFit, Inc. filed a lawsuit against the National Strength and Conditioning Association (NSCA) for publishing this study, alleging the data was false and "intended to scare participants away from CrossFit."

The NSCA denies CrossFit, Inc.'s  allegations but issued an erratum acknowledging that the injury data were incorrect.

In September 2016, the District Court ruled in favor of CrossFit Inc.'s claims that the injury data were found to be false, but not that the NSCA was commercially motivated or that the publishing of the study was defamatory as the NSCA no longer stood behind the study.

In February 2017, CrossFit filed for sanctions against the NSCA after one of the NSCA's witnesses admitted to falsifying statements during deposition. In May 2017, the Court issued 17 issues sanctions against the NSCA, writing that the organization did have a commercial motive to falsify the data, had published the false data knowingly to disparage CrossFit, and had misled the public with their erratum. CrossFit was awarded $74,000 in legal fees and allowed to continue investigating the NSCA. If the neutral-party analysis of the NSCA servers turns up any further misconduct, CrossFit may file an amended complaint for further sanctioning and compensation for lost revenue.

In May 2019, CrossFit, Inc. contacted the Orthopaedic Journal of Sports Medicine with a demand for the retraction of another paper, published in the journal earlier that month. The paper states that CrossFit participants "are more likely to be injured and to seek medical treatment compared with participants in traditional weightlifting", a finding that CrossFit, Inc. claimed to be based on scientific errors and material from retracted or misrepresented studies.

Exertional rhabdomyolysis
The relationship between CrossFit and exertional rhabdomyolysis has been a subject of controversy for the company. Some medical professionals have asserted that both the CrossFit methodology and the environment created by CrossFit trainers put athletes at high risk for developing rhabdomyolysis.

A man successfully sued his uncertified CrossFit trainers and was awarded US$300,000 in damages, after he suffered from rhabdomyolysis after performing a CrossFit workout on December 11, 2005, at Manassas World Gym in Manassas, Virginia, under the said trainers' supervision. CrossFit, Inc. was not listed as a defendant in the lawsuit.

CrossFit, Inc. does not dispute that its methodology has the potential to cause rhabdomyolysis. The company states that exertional rhabdomyolysis can be found in a wide variety of sports and training populations and argues that its critics have conflated CrossFit's high awareness of rhabdomyolysis with high risk. One CrossFit spokesman stated that "ESPN's report on the 53 deaths in US triathlons from 2007 to 2013 should have put the issue to rest."

Since May 2005, CrossFit, Inc. has published several articles about rhabdomyolysis in the company's CrossFit Journal.  Three of the articles are included in the CrossFit Manual provided to all prospective trainers.

CrossFit, Inc. has also been criticized for having a "cavalier" attitude towards rhabdomyolysis by promoting a character known as "Uncle Rhabdo" (a cartoon clown dying dramatically—hooked up to a dialysis machine, with his kidneys and intestines falling on the floor). In response to this criticism, Greg Glassman stated, "We introduced (Uncle) Rhabdo because we're honest and believe that full disclosure of risk is the only ethical thing to do."

Social media controversies 
CrossFit, Inc. has been variously criticized and praised for its unorthodox approach to social media. This approach has included publishing articles and tweets about non-fitness topics (including politics, philosophy, and poetry) as well as directly interacting with other social media users and critics of the company's program.

On June 4, 2014, CrossFit uploaded a "parody video to their Facebook page" of Jesus, featuring concepts such as the "Holy Trinity of exercise".  Yasmine Hafiz wrote in The Huffington Post that some "viewers are outraged at the disrespectful use of a Christian symbol", with one user asking "on what planet is it comical or encouraged to mock someones belief?"

In June 2018, CrossFit fired its chief knowledge officer, Russell Berger, after Berger wrote about the LGBT community on Twitter. Berger's tweet followed the closure of a CrossFit location in Indianapolis due to the backlash it faced after canceling a special LGBT Pride Month workout. Berger wrote on Twitter "As someone who personally believes celebrating 'pride' is a sin, I'd like to personally encourage #CrossFitInfiltrate for standing by their convictions and refusing to host an @indypride workout. The intolerance of the LGBTQ ideology toward any alternative views is mind-blowing." The tweet triggered angry responses denouncing Berger as a bigot and pressuring CEO Glassman for him to be fired; Berger was first placed on unpaid leave, but was later fired by Glassman, who publicly condemned Berger.

In May 2019, CrossFit shuttered its Facebook and Instagram accounts, which had 3.1 million and 2.8 million followers respectively. On the company's homepage, the announcement stated that CrossFit was concerned about user privacy and security in the wake of "well-known public complaints about the social-media company that may adversely impact the security and privacy of our global CrossFit community." The company also cited theft of intellectual property and Facebook's collusion with "food and beverage industry interests" as reasons for deactivating its social media accounts.

On June 6, 2020, the founder of CrossFit Greg Glassman tweeted, "It's: FLOYD-19" in response to a tweet from the Institute for Health Metrics and Evaluation at the University of Washington that states, "racism and discrimination are critical public health issues that demand an urgent response." Glassman's tweet was widely panned; many CrossFit-affiliated gyms around the world responded by ending their affiliation, and Reebok also announced that they would end their corporate association.  Glassman also hosted a criticized Zoom call with CrossFit gym owners where he propounded conspiracy theories about COVID-19 and claimed that George Floyd had been killed as part of an elaborate cover-up of counterfeiting unrelated to racism. On June 9, 2020, Glassman resigned as CEO then two weeks later announced he had put the company up for sale.

See also
Aerobics
Calisthenics
Fitness and figure competition
History of physical training and fitness
Kettle bell lifting
National Pro Grid League
Olympic weightlifting
Plyometrics
Power training
Powerlifting
Strength training
Weight training

References

External links

 

 
2000 establishments in California
Exercise organizations
Physical exercise
Sports organizations of the United States